The British 5th Destroyer Flotilla, or Fifth Destroyer Flotilla, was a naval formation of the Royal Navy from 1910 to 1942 and again from 1947 to 1951.

History
The flotilla was formed in February 1910 and disbanded in 1942. Its first commander was Captain  Herbert E. Holmes-à-Court and its final commander was Captain Llewellyn V. Morgan. The flotilla was reactivated in March 1947 until December 1951. In January 1952 it was re-designated 5th Destroyer Squadron.

Organizational Changes
Note: Command structure organizational changes took place within Royal Navy post war period the term Flotilla was previously applied to a tactical unit until 1951 which led to the creation of three specific Flag Officers, Flotillas responsible for the Eastern, Home and Mediterranean fleets the existing destroyer flotillas were re-organized now as administrative squadrons.

Operational deployments

Administration

Captains (D) afloat 5th Destroyer Flotilla
Incomplete list of post holders included:
 Captain Herbert Edward Holmes à Court, 8 February 1910 
 Captain Noel Grant, 20 December 1910  – 20 December 1912 
 Captain Edward G. Lowther-Crofton, 1 May 1912 ] – 27 January 1914 
 Captain Charles P. R. Coode, 1 February 1914  – 15 May 1917 
 Captain F. Clifton Brown, 30 May 1917  – 15 August 1917 
 Captain George K. Chetwode, 15 August 1917 
 Captain Kerrison Kiddle, 1 March 1919  – 1 October 1919 
 Captain Theodore E. J. Bigg, 25 June 1921  – 16 August 1922 
 Captain Cyril St. C. Cameron, 16 August 1922  – 30 April 1924
 Captain Edward O. B. S. Osborne, 28 April 1924 
 Commander Reginald V. Holt, January, 1925  – 8 February 1925 
 Captain Edward O. B. S. Osborne, 10 February 1925 
 Captain Kenneth MacLeod, 1 April 1925 – 4 July 1926
 Captain James V. Creagh, 11 May 1925  – 10 October 1925 
 Captain Lewis G. E. Crabbe, 4 July 1926  – 16 August 1927 
 Captain Lewis G. E. Crabbe, June, 1927 
 Captain Frank Elliott, 16 August 1927  – 16 August 1929 
 Captain Ronald H. C. Hallifax, 16 August 1929 – 16 August 1931
 Captain Geoffrey R. S. Watkins, 16 August 1931  – 24 April 1933 
 Captain Arthur L. St. G. Lyster, 11 November 1932 – 30 April 1935
 Captain Harold M. Burrough, 30 April 1935 – 16 June 1937
 Captain Llewellyn V. Morgan, 16 June 1937 – 1 May 1939

Composition post war period
Included: 
,  Home Fleet from March 1947
5th Destroyer Flotilla
  (Leader)
 
 
 
 
 

,  Home Fleet 1947
5th Destroyer Flotilla
  HMS Solebay (Leader)
  HMS Cadiz
  HMS Gabbard 
  HMS St. James 
  HMS St. Kitts 
  HMS Sluys

,  Home Fleet 1948
5th Destroyer Flotilla
  HMS Solebay (Leader)
  HMS Cadiz
  HMS Gabbard 
  HMS St. James 
  HMS St. Kitts 
  HMS Sluys

,  Home Fleet 1949
5th Destroyer Flotilla
  HMS Solebay (Leader)
  HMS Cadiz
  HMS Gabbard 
  HMS St. James 
  HMS St. Kitts 
  HMS Sluys
 
,  Home Fleet 1950
5th Destroyer Flotilla
  HMS Solebay (Leader)
  HMS Cadiz
  HMS Gabbard - (September 1950)
  HMS St. James - (September 1950)
  HMS St. Kitts 
  HMS Sluys

,  Home Fleet 1951
5th Destroyer Flotilla
  HMS Solebay (Leader)
  HMS Cadiz - later replaced by HMS Gabbard
  HMS St. Kitts - later replaced by HMS St. James
  HMS Sluys

References

Sources
 Harley, Simon; Lovell, Tony. (2018) "Fifth Destroyer Flotilla (Royal Navy) - The Dreadnought Project". www.dreadnoughtproject.org. Harley and Lovell.
 Whitby, Michael (2011). Commanding Canadians: The Second World War Diaries of A.F.C. Layard. Vancouver, Canada: UBC Press. .
 The Fifth Destroyer Flotilla on Patrol and Carrying Out Gunnery Practice at Sea. January 1941, On Board HMS Kashmir. Flotilla Leader HMS KellyY with her  Flotilla For The First Time Since Her Refit". Imperial War Museums. Imperial War Museum UK.

Destroyer flotillas of the Royal Navy
Military units and formations established in 1910
Military units and formations disestablished in 1942